Shuidong is a village of the town of Luohe, Ju County, Rizhao, Shandong Province, China. The dialect of Shuidong is Qingdao dialect.

Xiatun is on its west, with Guozhuang nearby. On the south is Wangjialing, and north is the Shanjia Haipo.

History 
Liu settled the village, named from "the east of the river". 
The river is named "Shu River".

References

Villages in China
Ju County